The DuBois Miners were a minor league baseball team based in DuBois, Pennsylvania. From 1905 to 1907, the Miners played as members of the Class D level Interstate League. In their three seasons of play, the Dubois Miners hosted home minor league games at City  Park.

History
In 1905, DuBios began minor league play, with the DuBois "Miners" becoming members of the six–team Class D level Interstate League during the season. The Bradford Drillers, Coudersport Giants, Erie Fishermen, Jamestown Hill Climbers, Kane Mountaineers and Olean Refiners began league play on April 25, 1905. 

On, July 12, 1905, the Jamestown Hill Climbers of the Interstate League moved to DuBois with an 18–23 record.  After compiling a 22-37 record while based in DuBois, the Miners ended the 1905 season in last place, with an overall record of 40–60. The Miners placed sixth in the Interstate League standings, with Harry Knight and John Lawley serving as managers. In the final standings, the Coudersport Giants finished 1.0 game ahead of the 2nd place Erie Fisherman (58–39), followed by The Olean Refiners (54–50), Bradford Drillers (46–54), Kane Mountaineers (40–56) and Jamestown Hill Climbers/DuBois Miners (40–60) followed in the standings.

The DuBois Miners continued play in 1906 and ended the Class D level Interstate League season in fifth place in the eight–team league. With a record of 52–52, the Miners were managed by Jimmie Breen and Bunny Larkin. In the final standings, the Miners finished 12.0 games behind the first place Erie Fisherman.

In their final season, the 1907 Miners folded during the season.On August 5, 1907, the Miners franchise folded. After beginning play in the eight–team league, the DuBois Miners ended their 1907 season with a record of 36–26. Bunny Larkin again served as manager.

The Interstate League continued play in 1908, but the Miners did not rejoin as a league franchise. DuBois has not hosted another minor league team.

The ballpark
The DuBois Miners hosted home minor league games at City Park. The ballpark was located at Liberty Boulevard & Parkway Drive. City Park is still in use today as a public park containing the city pool.

Timeline

Year–by–year records

Notable alumni

Bunny Larkin (1906–1907, MGR)
Doc Martell (1906–1907)
Herbie Moran (1906)
John W. Weimer (1907)

See also
DuBois Miners players

References

External links
 Baseball Reference

Defunct minor league baseball teams
Baseball teams established in 1905
Baseball teams disestablished in 1907
Defunct baseball teams in Pennsylvania
Defunct Interstate League teams
Clearfield County, Pennsylvania